Nickels-Milam House is a historic plantation house located near Laurens, Laurens County, South Carolina. It was built about 1828, and is a three-story, five bay, Greek Revival style frame dwelling. The interior has original moldings, paneled doors, mantels, wide-board flooring and much of the original hardware. Also on the property are several barns and the family cemetery.

It was added to the National Register of Historic Places in 1976.

References

Plantation houses in South Carolina
Houses on the National Register of Historic Places in South Carolina
Greek Revival houses in South Carolina
Houses completed in 1828
Houses in Laurens County, South Carolina
National Register of Historic Places in Laurens County, South Carolina